Pakalppooram is a 2002 Indian Malayalam-language comedy horror film directed by Anil Babu and written by Rajan Kiriyath. Starring Mukesh, Geethu Mohandas and Kavitha Jose. It was released on 19 April 2002 and ran 100 days in Ernakulam Lulu Theatre.

Plot

The story is about a young Brahmin, Gouridasan Namboothiri living in a poor family with his mother and sisters. Gouridasan's father, Suryamangalathu Brahmadathan Namboothiri was an esteemed priest, but after his death, his mother, sisters, and him were thrown out of the family by his evil younger brother, Surya Namboothiri.

Later in order to get his rights in the ancestral family property, he and his friend Ayyappankutty masquerade themselves as the priests who have come to stop a vampire, in order to steal the documents of his rights.

Later they understand that the place is in fact haunted by a vampire, and the story revolves around his struggles to stop the ghost, as his father had once succeeded.

Cast

Soundtrack

 Hey Shingaari - P Jayachandran, K S Chitra
 Maayam chollum - K S Chitra
 Mohaswaroopini - K S Chitra
 Nadavazhiyum - Pandalam Balan
 Pakalpooram - Vidhu Pradhaap

References

2002 films
2000s Malayalam-language films
Films scored by Raveendran